Pier Luigi Celata (born 23 January 1937) is an Italian prelate of the Catholic Church who from July 2012 to December 2014 was Vice Camerlengo of the Holy Roman Church. He spent much of his career in the diplomatic service of the Holy See. He became an archbishop in 1986 and from 1986 to 2002 was Apostolic Nuncio to several countries.

Biography
He was born in Pitigliano, in province of Grosseto, on 23 January 1937. On 8 October 1961 he was ordained a priest for Dioceof Pitigliano.

12 December 1985 Pope John Paul II names him titular archbishop of Doclea and apostolic nuncio to Malta. He received his episcopal consecration on 6 January 1986 from John Paul. On 7 May 1988 he was also named Nuncio to the Republic of San Marino, and on 26 June 1992 also Nuncio to Slovenia.

On 6 February 1995 he was transferred to the Apostolic Nunciature to Turkey, and on 3 April 1997 he was also appointed Nuncio to Turkmenistan. On 3 March 1999 he became Nuncio to Belgium and Luxembourg.

On 14 November 2002 he was appointed secretary of the Pontifical Council for Interreligious Dialogue, a post he held until he was replaced on 30 June 2012 by Miguel Ayuso Guixot. On 21 December 2002, John Paul made him a member of the Pontifical Council for the Pastoral Care of Migrants.

On 5 March 2012, Benedict made him a member of the Pontifical Council for Promoting the New Evangelization. On 23 July 2012, Pope Benedict XVI appointed him Vice Camerlengo of the Holy Roman Church and on 28 July he was named a member of the Congregation for Bishops.

On 20 December 2014, he was replaced as Vice Camerlengo by Archbishop Giampiero Gloder and retired a month before his 78th birthday.

References

External links

 Catholic Hierarchy: Archbishop Pier Luigi Celata 

1937 births
Living people
Apostolic Nuncios to Malta
Apostolic Nuncios to San Marino
Apostolic Nuncios to Slovenia
Apostolic Nuncios to Turkey
Apostolic Nuncios to Turkmenistan
Apostolic Nuncios to Belgium
Apostolic Nuncios to Luxembourg
People from Pitigliano